Biancamaria Furgeri (born 6 October 1935) is an Italian organist, music educator and composer.

Life
Biancamaria Fugeri was born in Rovigo, Italy, and studied at the Conservatorio di Padova and in Milan and Venice with Wolfgango Dalla Vecchia, Bruno Coltro, Bruno Bettinelli, Giuseppe Piccioli and Giorgio Federico Ghedini.

After completing her studies, Furgeri taught music in Ferrara and Padua, and in 1969 took a teaching position at the Conservatorio G.B. Martini in Bologna. Her works have been performed internationally. She has placed first in a number of international competitions, including the 1973 National Sacred Music competition in Verese, the 1985 GEDOK competition in Mannheim, and the 1987 International Competition for Women Composers in Zürich.

Works
Fugeri composes mostly orchestral, choral, chamber and vocal works. Selected compositions include:

1958 Sonata, Opus 1	
1960 Piano Suite, Op 2		
1963 Sonata, Opus 3 for organ	 	
1965 Suite by Gioconda, Opus 4	
1968 Toccata and Ricercare,Opus 5 for organ	
1970-71 Piccoli Musici (Volume 1), Op 6	
1970-71 Piccoli Musici (Volume 2), Opus 7			
1972 Il libro dei Ritmi e dei Suoni, Opus 8		
1973 Fair, Opus 9		 	
1974 Discanto, Opus 10 for chorus			
1975 Antifonie, Opus 12 for orchestra
1975 Consonance, Opus 13 for chamber ensemble
1975 Voci del tempo, Opus 11 for chorus		
1977 Canzone del Pastore / Cavallino bianco e nero - luvenilia,	 op 15 for chorus	
1977 Il Fuggitivo, Opus 14 for chorus			
1980 Juvenilia, Opus 16 for piano	
1981 Duplum, Op 17 for duo	
1983 Cantico, op. 20 for chamber ensemble
1983 Moods, op 18 for orchestra	
1983 Pars mea Dominus, op 19		 	
1985 Là dove autunni e primavere, Opus 23 for chorus		
1985 Ritorno, Opus 22 for chorus	
1985 Tre episodic, Opus 24 for string quartet	
1986 Opposizioni, Opus 26 for duo		 	
1986 Otto piccoli pezzi per Ilaria, Op 25 for piano	
1987 Levia, Opus 27 for orchestra	
1989 Il canto Sognato, Op 29 for chamber ensemble
1989 Intarsi (Antichi modi di Canto), Opus 28 for orchestra		
1990 A due gioco per quattro, Opus 35 for chamber ensemble		 	
1990 Story, Op.36''

References

Italian women classical composers
1935 births
Living people
Italian music educators
Italian classical composers
20th-century classical composers
20th-century Italian composers
Women music educators
20th-century women composers
20th-century Italian women